Aleksandrowo  is a settlement in the administrative district of Gmina Orzysz, within Pisz County, Warmian-Masurian Voivodeship, in northern Poland.

This settlement did not exist before 1945, therefore it has no German name.

References

Aleksandrowo